Subsection may refer to:

 Subsection (botany), a taxonomic rank for plants, below section and above species
 Subsection (typography), a section within a section of a document
 Subsection (zoology), a taxonomic rank for animals, below section and above family